Thomas Berkeley, 6th Baron Berkeley (c. 1505 – 19 September 1534) was an English peer and member of King Henry VIII's court.

Family
Thomas Berkeley, sometimes called Thomas the Hopeful, was born at Hovingham in Yorkshire around 1505. He was the son of Thomas Berkeley, 5th Baron Berkeley and his first wife, Alienor Constable. At around the age of 10 he was adopted by his childless uncle, Maurice Berkeley, 4th Baron Berkeley, and taken by him to Calais, where he was educated. He returned to England following the death of his uncle in 1523 and the succession of his father to the barony. 

In 1525/26, he married Mary, the daughter of George Hastings, 1st Earl of Huntingdon. He succeeded his father as Lord Berkeley in January 1533. His wife died around six weeks later. 

Shortly after, he married Anne Savage, one of Anne Boleyn's gentlewomen. The speed of the marriage led to speculation that it was Anne's reward for having been a witness to the queen's wedding. In the summer of 1534, he and Anne leased Stone Castle, Kent. He died at Stone in September after a short illness, caused according to family tradition from a surfeit of cherries.

His first marriage was childless. By his second marriage he had two children:
Elizabeth Butler (née Berkeley), Countess of Ormond
Henry Berkeley, 7th Baron Berkeley, who was born after his father's death.

References

Sources
Smyth, John (1567–1640). The Lives of the Berkeleys, Lords of the Honour, Castle and Manor of Berkeley from 1066 to 1618, ed. Maclean, Sir John, 3 vols., Gloucester, 1883–1885

1500s births
1534 deaths
Year of birth uncertain
Barons Berkeley
People from Hovingham